Philip Edward Archer  (22 February 1925 – 10 May 2002) was the Chief Justice of Ghana between 1991 and 1995. He was the eighth person to hold this position since Ghana became an independent nation. He died on 10 May 2002.

Life
Philip Edward Archer was born 22 February 1925, Abontiakrom, Tarkwa. He was educated at St Peter's School in Sekondi, Adisadel College, Cape Coast and the University of Nottingham in England. Admitted a solicitor of the Supreme Court of Jurisdiction of England and Wales in 1957, he returned to Ghana and joined the office of the Registrar-General. Appointed registrar-general in 1959 and judicial secretary in 1961, he became a High Court judge in 1964 and a Supreme Court judge in 1980. He was pro-chancellor and chairman of the University of Cape Coast Council from 1979 to 1983. Retiring as a judge in 1983, he was appointed full-time chairman of the Law Reform Commission. Chief Justice from 1991 until 1995, he was made a member of the Council of State in 1995. In 2000 he was honoured with the Order of the Star of Ghana.
He died at the Korle Bu Teaching Hospital on 10 May 2002.

See also
Chief Justice of Ghana
List of judges of the Supreme Court of Ghana
Supreme Court of Ghana

References

1925 births
2002 deaths
20th-century Ghanaian lawyers
Recipients of the Order of the Star of Ghana
Alumni of Adisadel College
People from Western Region (Ghana)
Justices of the Supreme Court of Ghana
Fante people
Ghanaian Anglicans